Renato Gonçalves de Lima (born September 14, 1991 in Serra Talhada), known as Renatinho, is a Brazilian football midfielder for Maltese club Birkirkara.

Career
In the second half of 2014, he reached the milestone of 140 games and 15 goals.

On 29 June 2019, Renatinho joined Maltese club Birkirkara.

Honours
Santa Cruz
Campeonato Pernambucano: 2011, 2012, 2013, 2015 and  2016
Campeonato Brasileiro Série C: 2013
Taça Chico Science: 2016
Copa do Nordeste: 2016

Qadsia SC
 Kuwait Crown Prince Cup: 2017-18

References

External links
 Renatinho at playmakerstats.com (English version of ogol.com.br)
 
 

1991 births
Living people
Brazilian footballers
Brazilian expatriate footballers
Santa Cruz Futebol Clube players
Campinense Clube players
Fortaleza Esporte Clube players
Qadsia SC players
Campeonato Brasileiro Série B players
Campeonato Brasileiro Série C players
Campeonato Brasileiro Série D players
Kuwait Premier League players
Association football midfielders
Brazilian expatriate sportspeople in Kuwait
Expatriate footballers in Kuwait
Brazilian expatriate sportspeople in Malta
Expatriate footballers in Malta